Ian "Danny" Bowers (born 16 January 1955) is a former footballer who played in the Football League for Crewe Alexandra, Shrewsbury Town and Stoke City.

Career
Bowers was born in Stoke-on-Trent and began his career with Stoke City after progressing through the youth and reserve ranks at the Victoria Ground.  He was thrust into the first team by manager Tony Waddington in 1974–75 due to a number of injuries to Stoke's defence and he played in ten matches. He played nine times in 1975–76 and then played 16 times in 1976–77.  That campaign however was a very poor one for Stoke as they were relegated to the Second Division.  Bowers struggled to get back into the side thereafter and after a loan spell at Shrewsbury Town he joined Crewe Alexandra in August 1979, signed by former manager Waddington.

At the Alexandra Stadium Bowers became a regular under Waddington and then Arfon Griffiths and Peter Morris. He spent five seasons with the "Alex" making 191 appearances.

Career statistics
Source:

A.  The "Other" column constitutes appearances and goals in the Football League Trophy.

References

External links
 

English footballers
Stoke City F.C. players
Crewe Alexandra F.C. players
Shrewsbury Town F.C. players
English Football League players
1955 births
Living people
Association football defenders